The Supreme Soviet of the Uzbek SSR was the supreme soviet (main legislative institution) of the Uzbek SSR from 1938 to 1991. The Supreme Soviet of the Uzbek SSR was preceded by the All-Uzbek Congress of Soviets which operated from 1925 to 1938. After the independence of Uzbekistan in 1991, the Supreme Soviet of the Uzbek SSR was briefly succeeded by the Supreme Council of the Republic of Uzbekistan from 1991 to 1994.

The 1990 Uzbek Supreme Soviet election was the first and final supreme soviet election which allowed for multiparty elections.

History 
The Supreme Soviet of the Uzbek SSR was established pursuant to constitutional reforms within the Uzbek SSR, which changed the organization of main political organs of the republic. In theory, the Supreme Soviet was to be a legislative body that exercised power over the legislative branch of the Uzbek SSR. In reality, the Supreme Soviet's power was limited to approving decisions made by the Communist Party of Uzbekistan. When Uzbekistan achieved independence from the Soviet Union in 1991, the name of the Supreme Soviet of the Uzbek SSR was changed to the Supreme Council of the Republic of Uzbekistan. The Oliy Majlis replaced the Supreme Council of the Republic of Uzbekistan in February 1995.

Convocations 
Over the 53 years of its existence, the Supreme Soviet of the Uzbek SSR had a total of twelve convocations. The 12th and final convocation consisted of 500 deputies, which elected Islam Karimov as the President of the Uzbek SSR in 1990 and declared Uzbekistan's independence on August 31, 1991.

 1st Convocation (1938-1946)
 2nd Convocation (1947-1950)
 3rd Convocation (1951-1954)
 4th Convocation (1955-1959)
 5th Convocation (1959-1962)
 6th Convocation (1963-1966)
 7th Convocation (1967-1970)
 8th Convocation (1971-1974)
 9th Convocation (1975-1979)
 10th Convocation (1980-1984)
 11th Convocation (1985-1989)
 12th Convocation (1990-1991)

Chairmen of the Supreme Soviet

Chairman of the Presidium of the Supreme Soviet

See also 

 Supreme Soviet of the Soviet Union
 Supreme Soviet
 Uzbek SSR

References 

Historical legislatures
1938 establishments in Uzbekistan
1991 disestablishments in Uzbekistan
Government of the Soviet Union
Government of Uzbekistan
Uzbek Soviet Socialist Republic
Defunct unicameral legislatures
Uzbek